Gregory J. Mottola (born July 11, 1964) is an American film director, screenwriter, and television director.

Life and career
Mottola grew up in Dix Hills, New York, in a Catholic family of Italian and Irish descent. He received his BFA in art from Carnegie Mellon University and MFA in film from Columbia University.

He wrote and directed the 1996 independent film The Daytrippers, then concentrated for several years on directing in television for series such as Undeclared and Arrested Development. 

More recently, he has directed the feature films Superbad, Adventureland, and Paul. 

Adventureland (2009) is a "first love" story about a group of college-age kids working at an amusement park in the 1980s. The film starred Jesse Eisenberg, Kristen Stewart, Bill Hader and Kristen Wiig. It premiered at the 2009 Sundance Film Festival and received critical praise.

He directed Paul, a science fiction/comedy film about two comic book nerds (played by the film's screenwriters Simon Pegg and Nick Frost) who meet an alien named Paul while vacationing in the US.

, Mottola is writing a screenplay based on Leanne Shapton's Important Artifacts and Personal Property From the Collection of Lenore Doolan and Harold Morris, Including Books, Street Fashion and Jewelry, to be produced by Natalie Portman and Plan B Entertainment.

Later on, he returned to TV series, such as The Dangerous Book for Boys.

Personal life
Mottola is married to Sarah Allentuch and has three children.

Filmography

Film

Television

References

External links
 
 
 Greg Mottola on NPR

American film directors
American male screenwriters
American television directors
1964 births
Carnegie Mellon University College of Fine Arts alumni
Columbia University School of the Arts alumni
Comedy film directors
Living people
American people of Irish descent
Princess Grace Awards winners
People from Dix Hills, New York
Screenwriters from New York (state)